Wiag may refer to:

 Wiąg, a villate in Świecie County, in north-central Poland
 WIAG, the ICAO code for Gunung Batin Airport, in Astraksetra, Indonesia